The prangi, paranki, piranki, pirangi, farangi, firingi, or firingiha was a type of cannon produced by Ottoman Empire. It was subsequently copied and produced in other place such as by Mughal empire under Babur. Prangi was a breech-loading swivel gun.

Etymology 

Prangi was written in Ottoman sources in various words as prankı, pirankı, parangi, parangı, pranga, pranku, prangu, and parangu. The Ottoman term goes back to the Italian/Spanish braga, short for "petriero a barga" and "pedrero de braga", a small breech-loading swivel gun. Braga itself means "pants" or "breech". Babur emperor in India called this weapon firingiha and farangi. Tamil and Telugu speakers call it pīranki and pīrangi.

History and description 
Prangi is a small Ottoman breech-loading swivel gun, firing 150 gram shots, they were built mostly by cast bronze, but iron ones is also used. The Ottomans used the prangi from the mid-15th century onwards in field battles, aboard their ships, and in their forts, where prangis often comprised the majority of the ordnance. At the end of the 15th century Ottoman galley had a big cannon and 4 guns (darbzen) and 8 prangi cannons. These ships were 42-43 meters long with three sails carrying about 328 people. Prangi was a standard piece of Ottoman secondary naval armament. An Ottoman naval record book of inventory and survey dated 10 April 1488 mentioned that Ottoman barça (barque) had 35 prangi, agrıpar (galleas) had 16 prangi, kadırga (galley) had 8 prangi, kalıt (galliot) and kayık (fusta) had 4 prangi.

See also 

 Breech-loading swivel gun
 Swivel gun
 Zamburak

References 

Firearm terminology
Naval artillery
Cannon
Artillery of the Ottoman Empire
Indo-Persian weaponry